The 1897 Limerick Senior Hurling Championship was the ninth staging of the Limerick Senior Hurling Championship since its establishment by the Limerick County Board in 1887.

Caherline were the defending champions.

Kilfinane won the championship after a 4–09 to 4–08 defeat of Cappamore in the final. It was their first championship title.

Results

Final

References

Limerick Senior Hurling Championship
Limerick Senior Hurling Championship